Conil de la Frontera is one of the White Towns of Andalusia in the province of Cadiz (region of Andalusia), located on the Atlantic coast in the southern part of Spain, with around 22,000 inhabitants. In summer its population exceeds 90,000 inhabitants.

It has six beaches: Playa La Fontanilla, Playa El Roqueo (with a 1936 Civil War bunker), Playa Fuente del Gallo, Playa Punta Lejos, Playa Cala del Aceite and Playa los Bateles. Playa los Bateles is the longest and the most popular in the summer. Conil de la Frontera is primarily a vacation town and the most of the tourists are Spanish although you often also hear German as well in town.

Every Friday you can visit the market on Avda. de la Música, which includes culture and history. The market includes many little trinkets and handmade clothes. The beach is sandy and has volleyball nets.

Gallery

References

Costa de la Luz
Municipalities of the Province of Cádiz
Port cities and towns on the Spanish Atlantic coast